Donna L. Pastore a professor of sport management at Ohio State University, in the School of Physical Activity & Educational Services. In addition, Pastore is the coordinator of Sport and Exercise Management at Ohio State and is a past president of the National Association for Girls and Women in Sport.

Pastore started off as an instructor at Penn State in 1981, and in 1988 she was promoted to assistant professor.  In 1991, she became an assistant professor at Ohio State University.  In 1996, she was promoted to associate professor, and full professor in 2002.

Education
 Bachelor's degree in physical education from the University of Florida in 1981.
 Master's degree in physical education from the University of Florida in 1983
 Doctorate in Education Administration from the University of Southern California in 1988.

Awards
 Earle F. Zeigler Lecture Award, 2002

External links
 Ohio State faculty webpage
 Pastore bio on UF alumni page

Living people
Ohio State University faculty
University of Florida alumni
South Plantation High School alumni
Year of birth missing (living people)